Edle Daasvand (born 23 December 1969, in Stavanger) is a Norwegian who was Party Secretary of the Socialist Left Party from 2005 to 2009.

References 

1969 births
Living people
Socialist Left Party (Norway) politicians